New Force may refer to the following political parties/groupings:
 New Force (Iceland), a short-lived minor anti-immigration party in the 2000s
 New Force (Italy), a minor far-right party since the 1970s
 New Force (Spain), a Francoist party, 19661982
 New Force Party in Thailand, a centre-left party, 19741988
 Ulster Conservatives and Unionists - New Force in Northern Ireland, the United Kingdom, a centre-right alliance, 20092012

See also
New Forces (disambiguation)